Suzanne Simard (born 1960) is a Canadian scientist who is a professor in the Department of Forest and Conservation Sciences at the University of British Columbia. After growing up in the Monashee Mountains, British Columbia, she received her PhD in Forest Sciences at Oregon State University. Prior to teaching at the University of British Columbia, Simard worked as a research scientist at the British Columbia Ministry of Forests.

Simard is best known for the research she conducted on the underground networks of forests characterized by fungi and roots. She studies how these fungi and roots facilitate communication and interaction between trees and plants of an ecosystem. Within the communication between trees and plants is the exchange of carbon, water, nutrients and defense signals between trees. Simard is also a leader of TerreWEB, an initiative set to train graduate students and post-doctoral fellows in global change science and its communication.

She used rare carbon isotopes as tracers in both field and greenhouse experiments to measure the flow and sharing of carbon between individual trees and species, and discovered, for instance, that birch and Douglas fir share carbon.  Birch trees receive extra carbon from Douglas firs when the birch trees lose their leaves, and birch trees supply carbon to Douglas fir trees that are in the shade.

Mother trees
Simard identified something called a hub tree, or "mother tree". Mother trees are the largest trees in forests that act as central hubs for vast below-ground mycorrhizal networks.  A mother tree supports seedlings by infecting them with fungi and supplying them the nutrients they need to grow.

She discovered that Douglas firs provide carbon to baby firs.  She found that there was more carbon sent to baby firs that came from that specific mother tree, than random baby firs not related to that specific fir tree.  It was also found the mother trees change their root structure to make room for baby trees.

Her book Finding the Mother Tree asserts that forest ecologies are interdependent with fungal mycelium. She asserts that trees (and other plants) exchange sugars through their respective root systems and through interconnected fungal mycelial structures to share (and at times trade) micronutrients.

Interspecies cooperation
Simard found that "fir trees were using the fungal web to trade nutrients with paper-bark birch trees over the course of the season". For example, tree species can loan one another sugars as deficits occur within seasonal changes. This is a particularly beneficial exchange between deciduous and coniferous trees as their energy deficits occur during different periods. The benefit "of this cooperative underground economy appears to be better over-all health, more total photosynthesis, and greater resilience in the face of disturbance".

Science communication
Suzanne Simard is an advocate of science communication. At the University of British Columbia she initiated with colleagues Dr. Julia Dordel and Dr. Maja Krzic the Communication of Science Program TerreWEB, which has been training graduate students to become better communicators of their research since 2011. Simard has appeared in videos intended for general audiences, including three TED talks, the short documentary Do trees communicate?,  and the longer documentary films Intelligent Trees (where she appears alongside forester and author Peter Wohlleben) and Fantastic Fungi. New Scientist magazine interviewed Simard in 2021. Suzanne Simard has published a book where she reviews her discoveries about the life of trees and forests along with autobiographical notes.

Simard discussed her work and her book Finding the Mother Tree on BBC Radio 4's Woman's Hour in March 2022.

Popular culture
Simard's life and work served as the primary inspiration for Patricia Westerford, a central character in Richard Powers' 2018 Pulitzer Prize winning novel The Overstory, in which Westerford pioneers the controversial idea that trees can communicate with each other, and is ridiculed by fellow scientists before eventually being vindicated.

Simard's work was referenced in Season 2, Episode 11 of the Apple TV+ series Ted Lasso when Coach Beard says:
"You know, we used to believe that trees competed with each other for light. Suzanne Simard's field work challenged that perception, and we now realize that the forest is a socialist community. Trees work in harmony to share the sunlight."

In 2022 Simard appeared as a panelist in Canada Reads, advocating for Clayton Thomas-Müller's book Life in the City of Dirty Water.

See also
Frederic Clements - an earlier proponent of cooperative communities of plants
Ragan Callaway - another modern proponent of cooperation

References

External links
 Suzanne Simard: How trees talk to each other | TED Talk 2016-07-22 – Introduction video explaining her findings
 “Mother Trees” Use Fungal Communication Systems to Preserve Forests
 Official Trailer "Intelligent Trees"  featuring Suzanne Simard and Peter Wohlleben
 The Social Life of Forests 

1960 births
21st-century Canadian women scientists
Canadian ecologists
Living people
Academic staff of the University of British Columbia
Women ecologists